Evergreen is a fantasy South Korean television series starring Lee Jong-hyun and Kim So-eun. It aired from March 5 to April 24, 2018 on OCN's Mondays and Tuesdays at 21:00 (KST) time slot for 16 episodes.

Synopsis
The story of two people who fall in love with each other due to a "cupid" possessing magical pollen.

Cast

Main
 Lee Jong-hyun as Oh Soo (27 years old), a promising IT engineer with a PhD in artificial intelligence. He is also a cafe owner and barista.
 Kim So-eun as Seo Yoo-ri (27 years old), a local police officer who is her family's breadwinner.

Supporting
 Kang Tae-oh as Kim Jin-woo (27 years old), Soo-jeong high school physical education teacher and Yoo-ri's childhood friend.
 Heo Jung-min as Oh Ga-na (30 years old), Oh Soo's older brother.
 Park Geun-hyung as Oh Man-soo (80 years old), Oh Soo's grandfather.
 Lee Hye-ran as Yoon Chae-ri, a veterinarian.
 Yoo Il as Park Min-ho, Yoo-ri's ex-boyfriend.
 Park Na-ye as Seo Soo-jeong, Yoo-ri's younger sister.
 Kim Ho-jung
 Jin Ye-ju as Han Hyo-jin, a woman who falls in love with for Oh Soo and tries to win him.
 Choi Dae-chul as CEO Nam Ji-seok

Special appearances
 Kim Ho-jung as Virgin Bodhisattva
 Won Ki-joon as Oh Soo's father
 Ko In-beom 
 Han Bo-reum as TBA (30 years old), Oh Ga-na's girlfriend.

Production
Filming for the fully pre-produced series was scheduled to start in December 2017.

Original soundtrack

Part 1

Part 2

Part 3

Part 4

Part 5

Part 6

Part 7

Ratings

References

External links
  
 
 

OCN television dramas
Korean-language television shows
2018 South Korean television series debuts
2018 South Korean television series endings
South Korean fantasy television series
South Korean romantic comedy television series
South Korean pre-produced television series